Joanne Evans is a former association football player who represented New Zealand at international level.

Evans made her Football Ferns début as a substitute in a record 21–0 win over Samoa in a Women's World Cup qualifier on 9 October 1998, and finished her international career with three caps to her credit.

References

Year of birth missing (living people)
Living people
New Zealand women's association footballers
New Zealand women's international footballers
Women's association footballers not categorized by position